Duddeston railway station is situated in the Duddeston area of Birmingham, England on the Redditch-Birmingham New Street-Lichfield Cross-City Line and the Walsall line. Services on the Cross-City Line (and occasionally on the Walsall line) are usually operated by Class 323 electric multiple units, while Class 350 electric multiple units are commonly used on services to and from Walsall.

History

Duddeston opened in 1837 as Vauxhall, the temporary Birmingham terminus of the Grand Junction Railway from Warrington. When the permanent terminus at Curzon Street opened in 1839, Vauxhall became a goods-only station. An extract from an 1859 railway inspector's report into a minor collision reveals something of how the station was operated:

The station was rebuilt and re-opened to passengers in 1869 under the LNWR and was renamed Vauxhall and Duddeston in 1889.

In 1941 it was hit by a bomb during a night raid and was destroyed. It was rebuilt in a temporary fashion, and in the mid-1950s it caught fire and was subsequently rebuilt.

The line through the station, to Walsall via Perry Barr, was electrified in 1966 as part of the London Midland Region's electrification programme. The actual energization of the line from Coventry to Walsall through Perry Barr took place on 15 August 1966.

The station was renamed Duddeston on 6 May 1974.

The entrance and ticket hall are over the tracks, on the Duddeston Mill Road bridge. The former Midland Railway line to Derby is nearby.

Adjacent are railway sheds that were once used for industrial purposes. They are now disused and the entrance has been blocked to prevent trespassing. A shed on the opposite side of the station to the remaining sheds has been demolished and its site is wasteland. The station has two island platforms serving four tracks, but only one island platform remains in use; the other has fallen into disrepair.

The remaining platform features artwork on black metal backgrounds.

Services

Two services in each direction stop every hour:

 On the Cross-City Line, between Four Oaks and Redditch, calling at all stations.
 On the Walsall Line, between Walsall and Birmingham New Street, calling at all stations. A limited number of trains continue past Walsall to Hednesford or Rugeley Trent Valley.

In 2011, London Midland proposed the closure of the ticket office. The request was denied.

References

External links

Rail Around Birmingham and the West Midlands: Duddeston Station
Warwickshire Railways page

Grand Junction Railway
Railway stations in Birmingham, West Midlands
DfT Category E stations
Former London and North Western Railway stations
Railway stations in Great Britain opened in 1837
Railway stations in Great Britain closed in 1839
Railway stations in Great Britain opened in 1869
Railway stations served by West Midlands Trains
1869 establishments in England
1837 establishments in England